"Family Tradition" is a song written and recorded by American musician Hank Williams Jr. It was released in May 1979 as the fourth and final single and title track from his album of the same name.  It peaked at No. 4, and is one of his most popular songs. It has sold 909,000 digital copies as of April 2016.

Content
The song is a Williams' statement of rebellion, not only in his lifestyle and living out the lyrics of his songs, but of his musical identity and direction.

With the latter point, the lyrics state Williams' unapologetic desire to forge his own style, particularly in response to criticism for his change from countrypolitan and covers of his father's songs. At the same time proclaiming how proud and honored he is to be part of his father's musical legacy, the younger Williams makes clear that his musical style – southern rock fused with honky tonk – is very different from the blues-oriented honky-tonk popular during Williams' lifetime.

Taking off on the point of his father, the younger Williams notes that the hard-living lifestyle is a "family tradition," referring to the alcohol and drug use that became associated with his personal life.

Charlie Daniels performed the fiddle-led bridge between the second and third verses.

When played in concert, at parties, or sung at karaoke, "Family Tradition" frequently becomes a call-and-response song during the chorus. One typical example:

"Why do you drink?"
"TO GET DRUNK!"
"And why do you roll smokes?"
"TO GET HIGH!"
"Why must you live out/the songs that you wrote?"
"TO GET LAID!"

Political usage
For the 2008 US presidential campaign, Williams wrote a version of the song called "McCain-Palin Tradition" which included a line suggesting that Barack Obama had "radical friends".

Chart performance

Certifications

References

1979 songs
1979 singles
Hank Williams Jr. songs
Songs written by Hank Williams Jr.
Song recordings produced by Jimmy Bowen
Elektra Records singles
Curb Records singles
Songs about alcohol
Songs about families
Songs about Hank Williams